

Season summary
The 2008–09 Victoria Salmon Kings season is the Salmon Kings' 5th season in the ECHL.  The season started with the Salmon Kings raising their West Division Championship banner above the arena floor, and continued towards the All Star break with the team establishing a 15-game winning streak between December 8, 2008 and January 10, 2009, which was second all time in ECHL history. With a 26-9-1-2 record at the end of the streak, and well in first place in their division, another banner seemed well within reach. However, the team went 12-19-0-4 afterwards and dropped to third place, which ensured a Kelly Cup playoff first round match-up against the Idaho Steelheads. In the playoffs, the Salmon Kings swept their first ever series by eliminating the Steelheads in round one in four straight games. Unfortunately in the second round, the Salmon Kings were eliminated from the playoffs by their arch rivals, the Alaska Aces in five games. Their lone win was a 4-0 shutout on home ice, their second shutout of the playoffs. Despite their second straight second round elimination, the '08–'09 season saw a number of team records. Dylan Yeo became the first Salmon King player to win a league award, as he was awarded the Defenseman of the Year. Also, team captain Wes Goldie set a new team record with 48 goals, while also becoming the first Salmon King to collect 200 points with the team. Finally, the team broke their previous attendance record with 4,923 fans, up from 4,871 the previous year and 4,248 in '06–'07.

Standings

Schedule and results

Regular season

Playoffs

Player stats

Skaters

Note: GP = Games played; G = Goals; A = Assists; Pts = Points; +/- = Plus/minus; PIM = Penalty minutes

Goaltenders
Note: GP = Games played; Min = Minutes played; W = Wins; L = Losses; OT = Overtime losses; SOL = Shootout losses; GA = Goals against; GAA= Goals against average; Sv% = Save percentage; SO= Shutouts

†Denotes player spent time with another team before joining Victoria. Stats reflect time with the Salmon Kings only. ‡Denotes player no longer with the team. Stats reflect time with Salmon Kings only.

Transactions

Trades

Free agents acquired

Free agents lost

Professional affiliations

Vancouver Canucks
The Salmon Kings' NHL affiliate based in Vancouver, British Columbia.

Manitoba Moose
The Salmon Kings' AHL affiliate based in Winnipeg, Manitoba.

Victoria Salmon Kings seasons
Victoria Salmon Kings, 2008-09
Vic